Richard Kindersley is a British typeface designer, stone letter carver and sculptor.

Career

Kindersley studied lettering and sculpture at Cambridge School of Art and in the  workshop of his father  David Kindersley, who was also a noted stone carver. His major public work is the Seven Ages of Man, a sculpture outside Baynard House in the City of London.

He has also constructed  a modern stone circle called The Millennium Stones created during 1998 to 1999 in Gatton Park Surrey, to mark the double millennium from AD1 to AD2000. The first stone in the series is inscribed with the words from St John's Gospel, "in the beginning the word was". The subsequent nine stones are carved with quotations contemporary with each 200 year segment, ending with the words of T S Eliot.

References

External links
Inside the Lines, Richard Kindersley Exhibition at the Victoria and Albert Museum

Living people
British letter cutters
Year of birth missing (living people)